The Third Federal Electoral District of Nayarit (III Distrito Electoral Federal de Nayarit) is one of the 300 Electoral Districts into which Mexico is divided for the purpose of elections to the federal Chamber of Deputies and one of three such districts in the state of Nayarit.

It elects one deputy to the lower house of Congress for each three-year legislative period, by means of the first past the post system.

District territory
Nayarit's Third District is located in the south of the state and covers the municipalities of
Ahuacatlán, Amatlán de Cañas, Bahía de Banderas, Compostela, Ixtlán del Río, Jala, San Blas, San Pedro Lagunillas, Santa María del Oro, Xalisco and La Yesca.

The district's head town (cabecera distrital), where results from individual polling stations are gathered together and collated, is the city of Compostela.

The Third District was created by the 1979 re-districting process; prior to that, Nayarit returned only two deputies to Congress.

Previous districting schemes

1996–2005 district
Between 1996 and 2005 the Third District had the same composition as at present, with the exception of the municipality of La Yesca, which belonged to Nayarit's Second District.

Deputies 

LI Legislature
1979–1982: Carlos Serafín Ramírez (PRI)
LII Legislature
1982–1985: Juan Medina Cervantes (PRI)
LIII Legislature
1985–1988: Enrique Medina Lomelí (PRI)
LIV Legislature
1988–1991: Olga López Castillo originally, later Rafael Mascorro Toro (PRI)
LV Legislature
1991–1994:  José Ramón Navarro Quintero (PRI)
LVI Legislature
1994–1997:  Liberato Montenegro Villa (PRI)
LVII Legislature
1997–2000:  Miguel Ángel Navarro Quintero (PRI)
LVIII Legislature
2000–2003:  José Manuel Quintanilla Rentería (PRI)
LIX Legislature
2003–2006:  Raúl Mejía González (PRI)
LX Legislature
2006–2009:  Sergio Sandoval Paredes (PRI)
LXI Legislature
2009–2012: Ivideliza Reyes Hernández (PAN)
LXII Legislature
2012–2015: Gloria Elizabeth Núñez Sánchez (PRI)
LXIII Legislature
2015–2018: Jasmine María Bugarín Rodríguez (PRI)

References and notes 

Federal electoral districts of Mexico
Nayarit